Central Park North may refer to:

 Central Park North, a section of 110th Street (Manhattan), New York City
 Central Park North–110th Street station
 Central Park North (album), a 1969 album by the Thad Jones/Mel Lewis Jazz Orchestra